Petra Georgina Yared (born 18 January 1979) is an Australian actress. She has also been credited as Petra Jared.

Early life 
Yared was born in Melbourne to Rick and Shelley, having an older sister, Sara, and younger brother, Nicholas. Yared is of Lebanese descent. At nine, she took part in acting workshops at the National Theatre in Melbourne, going on to audition and gain small television roles. She graduated with a Bachelor of Arts degree in History from the University of Melbourne, specialising in the history of the Middle East.

She began her career in children's television series including Sky Trackers and The Genie From Down Under 2.

Career
With a major role as Jo Tiegan, in the Australian-New Zealand television production Mirror, Mirror, she won the Australian Film Institute award for Best New Talent.

In 1996, she appeared in Neighbours as Georgia ("George") Brown. She returned to the soap in late 2007 in the recurring role of Mia Silvani.

Yared also had significant roles in series including Blue Heelers and The Secret Life of Us, and guest roles on All Saints (2008), City Homicide (2010), Rescue (2011) and Crownies (2011).

From 2002 to 2005, she was a main cast member on MDA, playing a friendly receptionist who was of the Baháʼí Faith. She plays FOCA analyst Joanne Peters, in Underbelly, episode "Badness".

Appearances in films include The Real Macaw and Journey to the Center of the Earth (1999).

She appeared in the Melbourne Theatre Company's stage production of Pride and Prejudice in Melbourne in 1999.

On being an actress, she says "I never know what type of role will appeal to me until I read the script, and then it's usually an instinctive response. I sometimes just 'get' the character immediately and I know how I want to play her". Being an actress, she says, allows her to explore different worlds, "whether it's trying to understand the psychology of someone suffering from post-traumatic stress disorder or researching a different religion or learning how to fire a gun."

Personal life
Yared is married to actor and playwright Travis Cotton. The couple have two children, Theodore (born 2011) and Vivien (born 2013). They live in Melbourne.

Television credits 

 Mirror, Mirror
 Sky Trackers
 The Genie From Down Under 2
 Good Guys Bad Guys
 Ocean Girl
 Halifax f.p.
 Neighbours
 Law of the Land
 Blue Heelers
 BeastMaster
 The Secret Life of Us
 Royal Flying Doctor Service
 MDA (TV series)
 All Saints – Rhiannon
 Rescue Special Ops - Zoe
 House Husbands

Awards 

 Australian Film Institute Young Actor Award 1996, for Mirror, Mirror

References

External links 
 Petra Yared website
 

1979 births
Australian people of Lebanese descent
Australian television actresses
Australian film actresses
Australian stage actresses
Living people
Actresses from Melbourne
Australian child actresses